Sunnyslope may refer to:

Canada
 Sunnyslope, Alberta, a hamlet

United States
(by state)
 Sunnyslope Mountain, Phoenix, Arizona 
 Sunnyslope, Arizona, a former town in Arizona.
 Sunnyslope, California, in Riverside County
 Sunnyslope, Butte County, California
Sunnyslope, Idaho
 Sunnyslope (Centreville, Mississippi), listed on the National Register of Historic Places (NRHP) in Amite County, Mississippi
 Sunnyslope (Bronx, New York), NRHP-listed in New York City
 Sunnyslope, Oregon
 Sunnyslope, Washington

Musical Artist
 Sunnyslope(Band)